George Woolston Pyke (28 August 1893 – 1977) was an English professional footballer who played in the Football League for Newcastle United as a centre forward. He had a notable spell in the North Eastern League with Blyth Spartans, for whom he scored 135 goals.

Personal life
Pyke served as a corporal in the Football Battalion of the Middlesex Regiment during the First World War.

Career statistics

References

English footballers
English Football League players
Association football forwards
British Army personnel of World War I
Middlesex Regiment soldiers
Newcastle United F.C. players
Blyth Spartans A.F.C. players
1893 births
Footballers from Gateshead
1977 deaths
Durham City A.F.C. players
Date of death unknown